The Bridgeboro Limestone is a geologic formation in Georgia and Florida. The limestones and sandstones of the formation preserve fossils dating back to the Early Oligocene of the Paleogene period.

See also 
 List of fossiliferous stratigraphic units in Georgia (U.S. state)
 List of fossiliferous stratigraphic units in Florida
 Paleontology in Georgia (U.S. state)
 Paleontology in Florida

References

External links 
 

Geologic formations of Georgia (U.S. state)
Geologic formations of Florida
Paleogene Georgia (U.S. state)
Paleogene Florida
Paleogene stratigraphic units of North America
Oligocene Series of North America
Rupelian Stage
Limestone formations of the United States
Shallow marine deposits
Paleontology in Georgia (U.S. state)
Paleontology in Florida